AOLserver is AOL's open source web server. AOLserver is
multithreaded, Tcl-enabled, and used for large scale, dynamic web sites.

AOLserver is distributed under the Mozilla Public License.

AOLserver was originally developed by NaviSoft under the name "NaviServer", but changed names when AOL bought the company in 1995.  Philip Greenspun convinced America Online to open-source the program in 1999.

AOLserver was the first HTTP server program to combine multithreading, a built-in scripting language, and the pooling of persistent database connections.  For database-backed Web sites, this enabled performance improvements of 100× compared to the standard practices at the time of CGI scripts that opened fresh database connections on every page load.  Eventually other HTTP server programs were able to achieve similar performance with a similar architecture.

AOLserver is a key component in the Open Architecture Community System (OpenACS) which is an advanced open-source toolkit for developing web applications.

In September 2007, a port of AOLserver for the iPhone was made available and later forked under the name "Joggame Server". This fork is described on its SourceForge project page as being a spin-off of AOLserver for devices.

NaviServer (also hosted on SourceForge) is a fork of AOLserver.

See also

 Comparison of web server software
 OpenACS

References

External links
 
 SourceForge Project: AOLserver
 Python for AOLserver
 AOLserver Wiki
 PHP on AOLserver
 AOLserver Public License
 NaviServer Fork Project Homepage

AOL
Cross-platform software
Free software programmed in C
Free software programmed in Tcl
Free web server software